Michael Luchkovich (November 13, 1892 – April 21, 1973) was a Canadian politician. He was the first person of Ukrainian origin to be elected to the Parliament of Canada.

Early life
His father, Ephraim and mother Maria immigrated from Nova Vis' in Austrian Galicia to Pennsylvania, where he worked as a miner and saloon owner where Michael was born.  Shamokin had a politically and culturally active community and in 1894 the Ruthenian National Association was formed there.  Michael's parents spoke the Lemko dialect and his older sisters also learned standard Ukrainian, but Michael spoke English almost exclusively, and worked outside the home preparing tobacco for making cigars.  After two of his older sisters emigrated to Canada to become teachers in one-room schools in Manitoba, and Michael followed.

Luchkovich attended high school at Manitoba College in Winnipeg and then began studying at the University of Manitoba, began learning the Ukrainian language and history from the Winnipeg Ukrainian community, and also began teaching part-time.  In 1912 he advertised himself as a teacher in the Ukrainian-language newspapers and was recruited by the trustees of Svoboda School near Lamont.  He continued to work in Alberta seasonally and return to Winnipeg until he graduated with an honours bachelor of arts degree in political science in 1916, and then enrolled at the Calgary Normal School in 1917, where he earned his qualifications as a teacher.  He taught three more years in New Kiew, Alberta before becoming the principal of the Michael Hrushewsky Institute, a bursa for Ukrainian high school and university students in Edmonton, but later returned to teaching in rural schools.

Political career
Luchkovich was approached by a committee of leaders in the Ukrainian community in 1926 to become the United Farmers of Alberta candidate in the district of Vegreville in the 1926 federal election.  To win the nomination he had to defeat the incumbent member of parliament, Arthur Boutillier and another Ukrainian-backed candidate, Peter Miskew.  Miskew was dropped after the first ballot and endorsed Luchkovich who secured the nomination by only three votes.  Despite a limited campaign budget religious and ethnic factionalism in the Vegreville area, he defeated Joseph McCallum, a former MLA for the area, by 700 votes.  His election made him the first person of Ukrainian descent to be elected to the federal Parliament.  He became a national spokesman for Canada's 200,000 Ukrainians, speaking against discrimination. Memorably in 1928 he gave an impassioned speech haranguing nativists like Bishop Lloyd and the National Association of Canada over rumors about a non-existent petition supposedly circulating in the Ukrainian community protesting Canada's discriminatory immigration laws.  Parliamentary and media opinion was impressed by Luchkovich's speech and the episode marked the high-point of nativist rhetoric against the Ukrainians, which subsided after this point.  While a member of parliament, he continued to work part-time as a rural school teacher, sleeping in small teacherages.

He was re-elected in the 1930 federal election over Liberal challenger Charles Gorden by 1,010 votes.  On May 8, 1931 Luchkovich gave a memorable speech criticizing the treatment of the Ukrainian minority by the Second Polish Republic and asking Canada to intervene, it was the first time the treatment of Ukrainians abroad had ever been broached in high-level Canadian politics.  The House agreed to recommend that the League of Nations investigate.  He subsequently was named as the sole delegate from the British Commonwealth to the International Inter-Parliamentary Union Congress in Bucharest and across Europe including the Ukrainian-majority areas of Rumania and Poland.

He was a founding member of the Co-operative Commonwealth Federation and ran under its banner in the 1935 election, but was defeated by Social Credit candidate William Hayhurst in the 1935 election.

Later life 
After starting and then quitting law school and working as a labourer, he opened a grocery store in 1944 which operated for fifteen years.  In 1946 the Ukrainian Canadian Committee asked his to prepare a brief to the Commons Standing Committee on Immigration and Labour arguing for the admission of Ukrainian displaced persons to Canada.  He later turned to literary pursuits of writing and translating.

Published works and honors
Luchkovich was a writer and translator of Ukrainian literature into English.  He translated One of the Fifteen Million by Nicholas Prychodko which was named a best books of 1952 by the Toronto Star, and was added to the Alberta school curriculum, and well as Sons of the Soil by Ilya Kiriak.  He wrote columns for Canadian Farmer, Ukrainian Voice, Svoboda, Western News, the Edmonton Journal, and the Calgary Herald where he argued for Multiculturalism in Canada and for Ukrainian independence from the Soviet Union.  He edited Their Land, an anthology of Ukrainian short stories.  He wrote two autobiographical works: A Ukrainian Canadian in Parliament (Toronto : Ukrainian Canadian Research Foundation, 1965. 128 p.) and My Memoirs, 1892-1962. (s.l . : s.n., 1963?. 204 leaves).

The Michael Luchkovich Scholarships For Career Development are named in his honor and awarded three times each year.  An award in his name was created in 1986 and is given annually to Alberta parliamentarians of Ukrainian descent who perform exemplary public service.

References

External links

The Michael Luchkovich Scholarships For Career Development

1892 births
1973 deaths
Members of the House of Commons of Canada from Alberta
United Farmers of Alberta MPs
American people of Ukrainian descent
Canadian people of Ukrainian descent
[[Category:Canadian socialists
Canadian socialists of Ukrainian descent
Co-operative Commonwealth Federation candidates for the Canadian House of Commons
20th-century Canadian politicians
American emigrants to Canada
Canadian autobiographers
Canadian schoolteachers
20th-century Canadian translators
People from Shamokin, Pennsylvania
American people of Lemko descent
University of Manitoba alumni
Ukrainian–English translators
Multiculturalism activists in Canada